In mathematics, a filtration   is an indexed family  of subobjects of a given algebraic structure , with the index  running over some totally ordered index set , subject to the condition that

If the index  is the time parameter of some stochastic process, then the filtration can be interpreted as representing all historical but not future information available about the stochastic process, with the algebraic structure  gaining in complexity with time. Hence, a process that is adapted to a filtration  is also called non-anticipating, because it cannot "see into the future".

Sometimes, as in a filtered algebra, there is instead the requirement that the  be subalgebras with respect to some operations (say, vector addition), but not with respect to other operations (say, multiplication) that satisfy only , where the index set is the natural numbers; this is by analogy with a graded algebra.

Whether this requirement is assumed or not usually depends on the author of the text and is often explicitly stated. This article does not impose this requirement.

Again, it depends on the context how exactly the word "filtration" is to be understood. Descending filtrations are not to be confused with the dual notion of cofiltrations (which consist of quotient objects rather than subobjects).

Filtrations are widely used in abstract algebra, homological algebra (where they are related in an important way to spectral sequences), and in measure theory and probability theory for nested sequences of σ-algebras. In functional analysis and numerical analysis, other terminology is usually used, such as scale of spaces or nested spaces.

Examples

Algebra

Algebras
See: Filtered algebra

Groups

Note that this use of the word "filtration" corresponds to our "descending filtration".

The topology associated to a filtration on a group  makes  into a topological group.

The topology associated to a filtration  on a group  is Hausdorff if and only if .

In particular, the two filtrations define the same topology if and only if for any subgroup appearing in one there is a smaller or equal one appearing in the other.

Rings and modules: descending filtrations

This is therefore a special case of the notion for groups, with the additional condition that the subgroups be submodules. The associated topology is defined as for groups.

When  is given the -adic topology,  becomes a topological ring.

Rings and modules: ascending filtrations

Flags are one important class of such filtrations.

Sets
A maximal filtration of a set is equivalent to an ordering (a permutation) of the set. For instance, the filtration  corresponds to the ordering . From the point of view of the field with one element, an ordering on a set corresponds to a maximal flag (a filtration on a vector space), considering a set to be a vector space over the field with one element.

Measure theory

In measure theory, in particular in martingale theory and the theory of stochastic processes, a filtration is an increasing sequence of -algebras on a measurable space. That is, given a measurable space , a filtration is a sequence of -algebras  with  where each  is a non-negative real number and

The exact range of the "times"  will usually depend on context: the set of values for  might be discrete or continuous, bounded or unbounded. For example,

Similarly, a filtered probability space (also known as a stochastic basis) , is a probability space equipped with the filtration  of its -algebra . A filtered probability space is said to satisfy the usual conditions if it is complete (i.e.,  contains all -null sets) and right-continuous (i.e.  for all times ).

It is also useful (in the case of an unbounded index set) to define  as the -algebra generated by the infinite union of the 's, which is contained in :

A σ-algebra defines the set of events that can be measured, which in a probability context is equivalent to events that can be discriminated, or "questions that can be answered at time ". Therefore, a filtration is often used to represent the change in the set of events that can be measured, through gain or loss of information. A typical example is in mathematical finance, where a filtration represents the information available up to and including each time , and is more and more precise (the set of measurable events is staying the same or increasing) as more information from the evolution of the stock price becomes available.

Relation to stopping times: stopping time sigma-algebras

Let  be a filtered probability space. A random variable  is a stopping time with respect to the filtration , if  for all . 
The stopping time -algebra is now defined as
.

It is not difficult to show that  is indeed a -algebra.

It can be shown that  is -measurable. However, simple examples show that, in general, .

See also
Natural filtration
 Filtration (probability theory)
 Filter (mathematics)

References

 

Algebra
Measure theory
Stochastic processes